Mary (née Ayer) Parker of Andover, Massachusetts Bay Colony, the daughter of John Ayer, was executed by hanging on September 22, 1692, with several others, for witchcraft in the Salem witch trials. She was a 55 year old widow. It is believed that Mary Parker’s family buried her body on their property, as was tradition for those who were executed. Mary's husband, Nathan, died in 1685. Nicholas Noyes officiated. Her daughter, Sarah Parker, was also accused. At the time of her execution, historians discovered the existence of three others with the same name as Mary Parker.

References

Further reading
 Upham, Charles (1980). Salem Witchcraft. New York: Frederick Ungar Publishing Co., 2 vv, v.2 pp 324–5, 480.

1692 deaths
17th-century executions of American people
People executed by the Massachusetts Bay Colony
People of the Salem witch trials
American people executed for witchcraft
People executed by the Province of Massachusetts Bay
People executed by the Thirteen Colonies by hanging
People executed by Massachusetts by hanging
Year of birth unknown